Chettappalam is a small village on Mysore Road between Mananthavady and Kattikkulam in Wayanad district, Kerala state, India.

Ondayangadi Junction
Ondayangadi junction is a busy town of Chettappalam area.  The junction begins the road to Thrishilery temple and Manikanda temple, Anappara.

Tourist attractions
Chettappalam is a village with very big tourist attractions because of the sprawling paddy fields and the undulating hills in the background.

Places of worship
There is one Sunni Mosque, one A.G.Church and several temples in Chettappalam.

Education
 St Marys English Medium School, Chettappalam

Transportation
Chettappalam can be accessed from Mananthavady town. The Periya ghat road connects Mananthavady to Kannur and Thalassery.  The Thamarassery mountain road connects Calicut with Kalpetta. The Kuttiady mountain road connects Vatakara with Kalpetta and Mananthavady. The Palchuram mountain road connects Kannur and Iritty with Mananthavady.  The road from Nilambur to Ooty is also connected to Wayanad through the village of Meppadi.

The nearest railway station is at Mysore and the nearest airports are Kozhikode International Airport-120 km, Bengaluru International Airport-290 km, and   Kannur International Airport, 58 km.

Image Gallery

See also
 Kattikkulam
 Thirunelly
 Mananthavady
 Valliyoorkkavu

Location

References

Mananthavady Area
Villages in Wayanad district